Panagiotis Vlachodimos (Greek: Παναγιώτης Βλαχοδήμος; born 12 October 1991) is a professional footballer who plays as a winger for 2. Bundesliga club Dynamo Dresden. Born in Germany, he has represented Greece at youth level.

Club career

Early career
Vlachodimos started his career with local club VfL Stuttgart-Wangen. He later joined VfB Stuttgart in 2001. He was promoted to the reserve team in 2010.

On 20 June 2011, Vlachodimos moved to Greek Superleague club Skoda Xanthi. He made his debut for the club on 28 August 2011 against PAOK. He scored his first goal against Panathinaikos, his next goal came against Olympiacos in a stunning 1–0 victory against the Greek giants, he scored his third and final goal of the season against PAS Giannina. For his efforts during the season, he won the best young player award for the 2011–12 season.

On 23 May 2012, Vlachodimos signed a five-year contract with Greek side Olympiacos for a transfer fee of €400,000. He made his debut on 20 October 2012 against his former club Skoda Xanthi in a 4–0 home win. In a Greek Cup match against Panachaiki, Vlachodimos assisted Kostas Mitroglou's goal in a 2–0 home win. On 14 February 2013, he also made his European debut against Levante in a 3–0 away loss. In the second leg against Levante of the Europa League, Vlachodimos made an impressive performance but it was not enough to save Olympiakos from being knocked out on a 4–0 aggregate. Three days later, Vlachodimos assisted Giannis Maniatis's goal in a 2–1 win over Aris on 24 February.  His first goal came one week later in Olympiakos's 4–0 away win over OFI. He also managed to score against Platanias in a 4–0 away win.

On 6 July 2013, Vlachodimos joined Bundesliga side FC Augsburg on a season–long loan. He made his first and only appearance for Augsburg on 10 August 2013 against Borussia Dortmund. At the end of the year, the club cancelled his loan and he returned to Greece. In January 2014 he signed for Platanias on loan from Olympiacos until the end of the season.

On 2 February 2015, Vlachodimos joined French Ligue 2 side Nîmes Olympique for the rest of the 2014–15 season. On 30 August 2015, after having returned to Olympiacos, his contract was dissolved and Vlachodimos became a free agent.

Panathinaikos
On 5 January 2016, it was announced that Panathinaikos had a deal with Vlachodimos, who was released by Olympiacos the previous summer and had been training with Greuther Fürth and Arminia Bielefeld. Eventually, on 6 January 2016, he signed with "The Greens".

On 30 January 2016, despite the probable legal actions for the signing of the player from Olympiacos, he was included in Panathinaikos' squad for the league away match against Platanias. Eventually, on 10 February 2016, he made his debut with the club in a 1–0 away loss against Atromitos for the Greek Cup coming in as a late substitute. On 14 February 2016 he made his debut in the Super League, opening the score in a 3–0 away win against PAS Giannina.

Return to Nîmes and Germany
On 10 July 2017, Vlachodimos signed for French Ligue 2 side Nîmes Olympique on a three-year contract, after not being in the plans of Panathinaikos coach Marinos Ouzounidis. On 27 August 2017, he scored his first goal with the club sealing a 1–0 home win game against Le Havre AC. At the end of the season, he returned to Ligue 1, for the first time since the 1992–93 season after finishing second in Ligue 2.

On 23 August 2019, Vlachodimos joined Sonnenhof Großaspach on a two-year deal.

Dynamo Dresden
On 15 July 2020, signed a two years contract with German club Dynamo Dresden for an undisclosed fee. On 1 May 2021 he scored against Uerdingen 05 in 3. Liga in the season 2020–21 at the Grotenburg-Stadion. On 16 May 2021 he scored against Türkgücü München at the Rudolf-Harbig-Stadion in 3. Liga in the season 2020–21. With Dynamo Dresden won the 3. Liga in the season 2020–21 and got promoted 2. Bundesliga.

On 19 September 2021, Panagiotis Vlachodimos during 2. Bundesliga's match against Darmstadt suffered a ruptured anterior cruciate ligament in his left knee and will need to be out of action for at least six months, with the player expected to undergo immediate surgery to repair the problem.

International career
Vlachodimos decided to represent Greece, the country of his origin, from youth level. He has played for the under-19 team and the under-21 team.

Personal life
Panagiotis is the older brother of Odysseas, who plays for S.L. Benfica in Portugal.

Career statistics

Honours
Olympiacos
 Super League Greece: 2012–13
 Greek Cup: 2012–13

Dynamo Dresden
 3. Liga: 2020–21

Nîmes
 Ligue 2: 2017–18

Individual
Greek Young Footballer of the year: 2012

References

External links
 
 
 
 

1991 births
Living people
Footballers from Stuttgart
Association football wingers
Citizens of Greece through descent
Greek footballers
German footballers
Bundesliga players
2. Bundesliga players
3. Liga players
Super League Greece players
Ligue 2 players
VfB Stuttgart II players
Xanthi F.C. players
Olympiacos F.C. players
FC Augsburg players
Platanias F.C. players
Ergotelis F.C. players
Nîmes Olympique players
Panathinaikos F.C. players
SG Sonnenhof Großaspach players
Dynamo Dresden players
German people of Greek descent
Sportspeople of Greek descent
Greece under-21 international footballers
Greece youth international footballers
German expatriate sportspeople in Greece
German expatriate footballers
Greek expatriate footballers
Expatriate footballers in Greece
Expatriate footballers in France